HAN (HIM) is a Norwegian drama film from 2021 directed by Guro Bruusgaard. The film is Bruusgaard's first feature film as a director, and she also wrote the script with Fijona Jonuzi. The film was produced by the production company Alternativet, which Bruusgaard runs together with Katja Eyde Jacobsen, Mariken Halle, and Magnus Mork. The film premiered during the Tromsø International Film Festival in January 2021 and the cinema premiere was on June 4, 2021.

Johannes Joner, Emil Johnsen, and Frank Werner Laug play the three main roles in the film. The film presents three different stories about the male role in Norway and follows the screenwriter Petter, 60 years old, played by Joner, who feels he is a victim of a gender quota when he does not receive financial support for a film about Fridtjof Nansen; unemployed Eirik, played by Johnsen, who loses support from the Norwegian public welfare agency; and 11-year-old Harald, played by Werner Lang, who is reprimanded by his teacher in front of the class.

The film won Eurimages' award for best film in progress and a prize of NOK 500,000 during the 2019 Norwegian International Film Festival. For the film, Marte Magnusdotter Solem was nominated for the 2021 Amanda Award in the category Best Supporting Actress.

Cast

 Johannes Joner as Petter
 Emil Johnsen as Eirik
 Frank Werner Laug as Harald
 Laila Goody as Harald's mother
 Marte Magnusdotter Solem as the teacher
 Gisken Armand as Tone
 Sigrid Huun as Eirik's mother
 Liv Bernhoft Osa as Gudrun
 Per Gørvell as Erling
 Thyri Bergljot Dale as a public welfare agency employee
 Ylva Gallon as Janne

References

External links 
 

2021 films
Norwegian drama films
2020s Norwegian-language films
2021 drama films